Let's Go to Paradise is a song by Australian pop rock band Mental As Anything, released in November 1986. It was released as the first single from the band's sixth studio album, Mouth to Mouth. The song was written by Mental As Anything guitarist Greedy Smith and peaked at number 15 on the Australian charts.

Track listings

Personnel 

 Martin Plaza – lead vocals, guitar
 Wayne de Lisle – drums
 Reg Mombassa – guitar, vocals
 Greedy Smith – lead vocals, keyboards, harmonica
 Peter O'Doherty – bass guitar, vocals

Charts

References 

Mental As Anything songs
1986 songs
1986 singles
CBS Records singles
Epic Records singles
Songs written by Greedy Smith
Song recordings produced by Richard Gottehrer